Losharik may refer to:

 Losharik, film
 Russian submarine Losharik